Ludwig von Mises Institute for Austrian Economics, or Mises Institute, is a libertarian nonprofit think tank headquartered in Auburn, Alabama, United States. It is named after the Austrian School economist Ludwig von Mises (1881–1973).

It was founded in 1982 by Lew Rockwell. Its creation was funded by Ron Paul.

History

The Ludwig von Mises Institute was founded in 1982 by Lew Rockwell. Rockwell, who had previously served as editor for Arlington House Publishers, received the blessing of Margit von Mises during a meeting at the Russian Tea Room in New York City, and she was named the first chairman of the board. Early supporters of the institute included F.A. Hayek, Henry Hazlitt, Murray Rothbard, Ron Paul, and Burt Blumert. According to Rockwell, the motivation of the institute was to promote the specific contributions of Ludwig von Mises, who he feared was being ignored by libertarian institutions financed by Charles Koch and David Koch. As recounted by Justin Raimondo, Rockwell said he received a phone call from George Pearson, of the Koch Foundation, who had said that Mises was too radical to name an organization after or promote.

Rothbard served as the original academic vice president of the institute. Paul agreed to become distinguished counselor and assisted with early fundraising.

Judge John V. Denson assisted in the Mises Institute becoming established at the campus of Auburn University. Auburn was already home to some Austrian economists, including Roger Garrison. The Mises Institute was affiliated with the Auburn University Business School until 1998 when the institute established its own building across the street from campus.

Kyle Wingfield wrote a 2006 commentary in The Wall Street Journal that the Southern United States was a "natural home" for the institute, as "Southerners have always been distrustful of government," with the institute making the "Heart of Dixie a wellspring of sensible economic thinking." The political scientist George Hawley described the Mises Institute in 2016 as "the intellectual epicenter of the radical libertarian movement in the United States".

Current activities 
The institute describes its mission as to "promote teaching and research in the Austrian school of economics, and individual freedom, honest history, and international peace, in the tradition of Ludwig von Mises and Murray N. Rothbard."

Its academic programs include Mises University (non-accredited), Rothbard Graduate Seminar, the Austrian Economics Research Conference, and a summer research fellowship program. In 2020, the Mises Institute began offering a graduate program. It has led to the creation of spin-off organizations around the world, including Brazil, Germany, South Korea, and Turkey.

The German Mises Institute (Ludwig von Mises Institut Deutschland e.V.) is an 2012 founded interest group and think tank of libertarian gold traders and investment advisors, which were associated with Swiss-based German billionaire August von Finck (1930–2021). Many gold dealers from the von Finck company Degussa Goldhandel are active on the board of the institute; they reject intergovernmental fiscal policy and promote gold as a "safe currency". Von Finck was active in economic policy and criticized the EU. He assumed the costs for expert opinions from prominent professors, such as Hans-Werner Sinn, with whose help the lawyer and politician Peter Gauweiler (CSU) took action at the German Federal Constitutional Court against the rescue packages for Greece and the Euro. The institute is scientifically supported by economists and philosophers, most of whom are organized in the Friedrich A. von Hayek Society and/or the Mont Pelerin Society. German Mises Institute has strong ties to the so-called Neue Rechte and AfD. The German Mises Institute works closely with the US-Mises Institute and with many other Mises Institutes around the world. It is not noticed in the EU Transparency Register.

Political and economic views
The Mises Institute describes itself as libertarian, and as promoting Austrian economics. Accordingly, in 2003, Chip Berlet of the SPLC described the institute as "a major center promoting libertarian political theory and the Austrian School of free market economics".

In particular, the Mises Institute favors the methodology of Misesian praxeology ("the logic of human action"), which holds that economic science is deductive rather than empirical. Developed by Ludwig von Mises, following the Methodenstreit opined by Carl Menger, it opposes the mathematical modeling and hypothesis-testing used to justify knowledge in neoclassical economics. Misesian economics is a form of heterodox economics. It is distinct from that of other Austrian economists, including Hayek and those associated with George Mason University.

Potentially extremist views 
In the early 90s, Austrian economist Steven Horwitz called the Mises Institute "a fascist fist in a libertarian glove."

In 2000, a report by the Southern Poverty Law Center (SPLC) categorized the Mises Institute as Neo-Confederate, "devoted to a radical libertarian view of government and economics."

In 2003, an article by Chip Berlet of the SPLC noted Rothbard's disgust with child labor laws, and wrote that other Institute scholars held anti-immigrant views.

In 2014, when a New York Times reporter requested a tour of the institute, Rockwell asked him to leave, saying the reporter was "part of the regime".

In 2022, fundraising emails sent by the Mises Institute reportedly told followers that "elections aren't working anymore", arguing that the system is irreformable, captured by "parasites such as the Deep State, the political class, and the Federal Reserve", and claiming that "the Founding Fathers would demand revolution."

Relationship with electoral campaigns 
The allegedly paleolibertarian and right-wing cultural views of some of the Mises Institute's leading figures, on topics such as race and immigration, have been influential in the presidential campaigns of Donald Trump and Ron Paul, as well as the candidacy of Joshua Smith for chair of the Libertarian Party.

In the late 1980s and early 1990s, Rockwell and Rothbard embraced racial and class resentments to build a coalition with populist paleoconservatives. This rhetoric appeared at the time in newsletters for Ron Paul that Rockwell was later identified as writing, including statements against black people and gay people that later became controversies in Paul's congressional and presidential campaigns. Separately, Rothbard's writing opposed "multiculturalists" and "the entire panoply of feminism, egalitarianism."

Candice Jackson, who served as acting head of the U.S. Department of Education Office for Civil Rights during the Trump Administration, was previously a summer fellow at the Mises Institute.

Notable faculty
Notable figures affiliated with the Mises Institute include:

 Walter Block – Austrian School economist and anarcho-capitalist; economics professor at Loyola University New Orleans
 Godfrey Bloom – British politician, former Member of the European Parliament
 Thomas DiLorenzo – economics professor at Loyola University Maryland
 Paul Gottfried –  paleoconservative author, former Professor of Humanities at Elizabethtown College
 Hans-Hermann Hoppe – philosopher, paleolibertarian, business professor at University of Nevada, Las Vegas, and founder of Property and Freedom Society
 Jesús Huerta de Soto – Professor of Applied Economics at King Juan Carlos University
 Peter Klein – Professor of Entrepreneurship and Senior Research Fellow with the Center for Entrepreneurship & Free Enterprise at Baylor University
 Robert P. Murphy – economist, Institute for Energy Research
 Andrew Napolitano – Fox News pundit and former judge
 Gary North – co-founder of Christian reconstructionism and founder of Institute for Christian Economics
 Ron Paul – physician, author, and former congressman
 Ralph Raico (1936–2016) – historian and libertarian specializing in European classical liberalism and Austrian economics
 Murray Rothbard (1926–1995) – heterodox economist, paleolibertarian theorist, polemicist, revisionist historian, and founder of anarcho-capitalism
 Joseph Sobran (1946–2010) – journalist, contributor to American Renaissance and lecturer at the Institute for Historical Review
 Mark Thornton – Austrian School economist
 Jeffrey A. Tucker – economics writer
 Joseph T. Salerno – academic vice president of the Mises Institute, Professor of Economics at Pace University, and editor of the Quarterly Journal of Austrian Economics
 Thomas Woods – historian, political commentator, and author

See also

 Libertarian Party Mises Caucus
 Old Right (United States)

References

External links 

 
 EDIRC listing (provided by RePEc)
 

 
1982 establishments in Alabama
Auburn, Alabama
Austrian School
Book publishing companies of the United States
Educational charities based in the United States
Libertarian organizations based in the United States
Non-profit organizations based in Alabama
Think tanks established in 1982
Political and economic think tanks in the United States